Severe Tropical Cyclone Cody was a strong tropical cyclone in the South Pacific which caused widespread damage in Fiji. The second tropical cyclone and first severe tropical cyclone of the 2021–22 South Pacific cyclone season, Cody was first noted by the Fiji Meteorological Service (FMS) on 5 January as Tropical Disturbance 03F. The tropical depression killed one person, and over 4,500 people were evacuated. On 10 January, the system was upgraded to a Category 1 tropical cyclone by the FMS, receiving the name Cody. While the FMS recorded a peak intensity of 130 km/h (80 mph), the Joint Typhoon Warning Center (JTWC) only recorded a peak intensity of 95 km/h (60 mph). Cody was the first tropical cyclone in 2022.

Meteorological history

The Fiji Meteorological Service (FMS) began monitoring a tropical disturbance on 5 January at 09:54 UTC, designating the system as 03F. Later that day, the Joint Typhoon Warning Center (JTWC) began monitoring 03F, though its development was inhibited due to wind shear. The system's chances of developing increased, and on 8 January, the JTWC issued a Tropical Cyclone Formation Alert for 03F. On the same day at 21:00 UTC, the JTWC upgraded 03F to a tropical depression, assigning it the designation 05P. 03F briefly weakened on the next day; however, it reorganized, with a satellite scatterometer pass showing winds of  prompting the JTWC to upgrade it to a tropical storm. On 10 January, the FMS upgraded 03F to a Category 1 cyclone on the Australian scale and assigned it the name Cody. The JTWC assessed that Cody transitioned into a subtropical cyclone on 11 January, with the FMS issuing its last advisory for Cody on 12 January at 19:15 UTC.

Preparations and impact
One person was killed as a result of the cyclone, with over 4,500 people evacuated in Fiji.

The tsunami that was caused by the eruption of Hunga Tonga–Hunga Ha'apai on January 15 was amplified in New Zealand as a result of the storm surge created by Cyclone Cody.

See also

Weather of 2022
Tropical cyclones in 2022

References

External links

Tropical cyclones in 2022
Tropical cyclones in Fiji
2022 in Fiji
Category 3 South Pacific cyclones